DXKI (90.3 FM), on-air as 90.3 Strong Radio, is a radio station owned by DCG Radio-TV Network and operated by Saturn Media Advertisement and Digital Marketing Corporation. The station's studio is located along Max Suniel St., Brgy. Carmen, Cagayan de Oro, and its transmitter is located at Upper Sumpong, Brgy. Indahag, Cagayan de Oro.

It was formerly known as 90.3 EQ and Star FM under Bombo Radyo Philippines through its now-defunct licensee Consolidated Broadcasting System from 1992 to circa 2010, when it went off the air.

References

Radio stations in Cagayan de Oro
Radio stations established in 1992
Radio stations established in 2019